Albarreal de Tajo is a municipality located in the province of Toledo, Castile-La Mancha, Spain. According to the 2008 census (INE), the municipality had a population of 709 inhabitants.

Toponymy
The root "alba" is probably derived from the Celtic roots albiga and albiganus. The municipality was formerly known as Albala, which is Arabic signifies "the sewer." During the 11th century, it was called Albalat, signifying in Arabic "the walk" or "the path," and by the 16th century it was known as Albarreal o Alcalá del Río.

During the 17th century, after receiving the title of Villa, the municipality changed its name to Alba Real. The local nobility still use this title, and the lord is known as the Count of Alba Real.

References 

Municipalities in the Province of Toledo